Out of Time is a 2003 American mystery thriller film directed by Carl Franklin and starring Denzel Washington. The two had previously worked together for the 1995 film Devil in a Blue Dress.

Plot
Matthias "Matt" Lee Whitlock is the respected Chief of Police of the small Florida Keys town of Banyan Key. Recently separated, Whitlock is currently seeing local resident Ann Merai-Harrison, an old flame from high school whose husband Chris, a former professional quarterback seemingly oblivious to the relationship, abuses her. While taking Ann to the doctor, Matt finds out she has just been diagnosed with terminal cancer. Matt is also going through a divorce from his wife, homicide detective Alex, and confides in his friend, medical examiner Chae.

Ann intends to reward Matt's loyalty to her by making him the sole beneficiary of her $1,000,000 life insurance policy. Matt suggests that she should travel to Switzerland to undergo a newly developed, groundbreaking treatment. The problem is that Ann does not have any money. Desperate to help her, Matt takes $485,000 out of evidence and gives it to her so she can make the trip. When the money goes up in flames in a suspicious house fire that kills Ann and Chris, Matt is horrified to find their charred remains.

Upon investigation, Matt discovers that the doctor that diagnosed Ann was an imposter, Ann didn't have cancer, and he has been set up.

When the Drug Enforcement Administration agents call the next day to get the evidence money in order to bust a higher drug lord, Matt responds erratically. He finds out that the money is now with the imposter doctor and that Alex is about to bust him. He rushes to the hotel and after a brief struggle, he accidentally kills the imposter, takes the money and flees. Although Matt is seen by the police, he is thought to have come to protect Alex.

Later that evening, Alex finds that Matt is Ann's sole beneficiary and also that he has been in a relationship with her. At the same time, Matt receives a distress call from Ann, who is still alive, and unofficially goes to save her. Chris and Matt fight, Ann shoots and kills Chris. Then Ann reveals that she had planned all of this for money and fortune, and shoots Matt in the leg.

When Ann is about to kill Matt, Alex kills her; Alex traced Matt using a GPS tracker and asks him whether he planned to elope with the money but Matt reveals that he has not brought the money with him. When the irritated DEA agents come to arrest Matt as he had promised to deliver the money earlier that day, he says that his man was sent to Miami, and simultaneously Chae appears with the money, explaining about a wrong address and that he could not find the DEA office. So the DEA agents leave with the money and Matt has no charges on him.

Later, when Matt is on medical leave, Chae visits him with news that Matt is the recipient of Ann's insurance policy. But Alex says that, "as his wife," she knows that Matt has to reject it, meaning that she has decided to drop the divorce and move back in with Matt. Overjoyed, Matt seemingly forgets about the life insurance money, though Chae is amusingly adamant that Matt must take it.

Cast

Awards

2004 Black Reel Awards
 Won: Best Theatrical Film
 Nominated: Best Actor, Denzel Washington
 Won: Best Actress, Sanaa Lathan
 Nominated: Best Director, Carl Franklin

2004 Image Awards
 Nominated: Outstanding Actor in a Motion Picture, Denzel Washington
 Nominated: Outstanding Supporting Actress in a Motion Picture, Sanaa Lathan

Reception
On Rotten Tomatoes the film has a score of 64% based on 150 reviews, with an average rating of 6.30 out of 10. The critical consensus states the film is a "fun and stylish thriller if you can get past the contrivances." On Metacritic it has a score of 63% based on reviews from 35 critics, indicating "generally favorable reviews".

Video game
WAP and Java mobile phone games based upon this movie were released in the UK in association with O2 and Momentum Pictures by Kalador Entertainment Inc.

Home media
Out of Time was released on VHS and DVD on January 6, 2004, in widescreen-only for both formats.

References

External links

 

2003 films
American crime thriller films
American neo-noir films
2000s crime thriller films
American police detective films
Metro-Goldwyn-Mayer films
Films set in Miami
Films directed by Carl Franklin
Films produced by Neal H. Moritz
Original Film films
Films scored by Graeme Revell
2000s English-language films
2000s American films